Ceraurinus is an extinct genus of trilobite in the order Phacopida. It contains one species, C. serratus.

External links
 Ceraurinus at the Paleobiology Database

Extinct animals of Asia
Ordovician trilobites
Paleozoic life of Ontario
Verulam Formation
Paleozoic life of the Northwest Territories
Paleozoic life of Nunavut
Paleozoic life of Quebec
Cheiruridae
Phacopida genera